The 2019 Lisboa Belém Open was a professional tennis tournament played on clay courts. It was the third edition of the tournament which was part of the 2019 ATP Challenger Tour. It took place in Lisbon, Portugal between 13 and 19 May 2019.

Singles main-draw entrants

Seeds

 1 Rankings are as of 6 May 2019.

Other entrants
The following players received wildcards into the singles main draw:
  Tiago Cação
  Roberto Carballés Baena
  Gastão Elias
  Frederico Ferreira Silva
  Adrian Mannarino

The following players received entry into the singles main draw using their ITF World Tennis Ranking:
  Javier Barranco Cosano
  Riccardo Bonadio
  Raúl Brancaccio
  Sandro Ehrat
  Grégoire Jacq

The following players received entry from the qualifying draw:
  Steven Diez
  Nicola Kuhn

The following player received entry as a lucky loser:
  Luís Faria

Champions

Singles

 Roberto Carballés Baena def.  Facundo Bagnis 2–6, 7–6(7–5), 6–1.

Doubles

 Philipp Oswald /  Filip Polášek def.  Guido Andreozzi /  Guillermo Durán 7–5, 6–2.

References

Lisboa Belém Open
2019
2019 in Portuguese tennis
May 2019 sports events in Portugal
2010s in Lisbon
2019 Lisboa Belém Open